Chelsea Football Club is an English professional football club based in Fulham, London. The club's involvement in international competitions dates back to the 1950s. As champions of England, the club was invited to participate in the inaugural European Champions' Cup in 1955, but were denied entry by The Football Association. Three years later, Chelsea made their European debut against Copenhagen XI in the Inter-Cities Fairs Cup, on 30 September 1958.

Chelsea won their first European title in 1971, defeating Real Madrid to win the European Cup Winners' Cup. In 1998, they won the same trophy again, followed by the UEFA Super Cup later that year. In 2012, Chelsea won the UEFA Champions League, becoming the fifth English team, and the first and only team from London to date, to win the competition. In 2013, Chelsea won the UEFA Europa League and became the fourth club to win all three main UEFA club competitions. Due to a change in competition dates, with the final of the Champions League being played a week after the Europa League final, Chelsea held both the Champions and Europa League trophies simultaneously, the only side to ever do so. Chelsea once again lifted the Europa League trophy in 2019. In 2021, Chelsea won their second Champions League title, giving them the distinction of being the only club to have won all three major European competitions twice. They are presently England's second-most successful club in UEFA competitions, with eight trophies in total.

John Terry holds the club record for appearances in European competitions with 124, while striker Didier Drogba is the club's leading European goalscorer with 36 goals. Chelsea's biggest European win is 13–0, which came against Jeunesse Hautcharage in the Cup Winners' Cup in 1971. Their 21–0 aggregate win over the same opposition is a joint-record in European football.

History

European Cup / UEFA Champions League
Chelsea were invited to take part in the inaugural European Cup, now UEFA Champions League, in 1955 after they claimed their first league title the previous season. However, Chelsea were pressured into withdrawing from the tournament by The Football Association. They had thus missed the chance to become the first English club to participate in what is now the most prestigious club competition in European football. It was not until 44 years later that they would make their debut in the Champions League.

The 1999–2000 season saw the club progress through the group stage and the second group stage to reach the quarter-finals where they faced Barcelona of Spain. Chelsea won the first leg 3–1 at Stamford Bridge with Gianfranco Zola scoring the opener and Tore André Flo a brace. However, they were beaten 5–1 in Spain two weeks later and knocked out of the competition 6–4 on aggregate, thus ended their first Champions League journey.

Chelsea qualified for the 2003–04 Champions League by finishing fourth in the 2002–03 FA Premier League. Their place in the Champions League was secured on the final day of the season, beating fifth-place Liverpool 2–1 at home. The game was dubbed 'the £20m match' as Chelsea were only ahead of Liverpool on goal difference before kickoff; a win for either side would see them qualify for the following season's Champions League at the expense of the other. Jesper Grønkjær scored the winner in the 26th minute. The goal would later seem by many as the most important in the club's history and said to be worth £1 billion, as many believe had Liverpool won on that day the subsequent takeover by a Russian billionaire Roman Abramovich would never have happened.

Chelsea reached the semi-finals after defeating derby rivals Arsenal 2–1 at Highbury. Having not beaten Arsenal since November 1998, they went into the second leg with a 1–1 home draw. José Antonio Reyes' goal before the half time gave the Gunners the lead, however Chelsea managed to come back and won in the second half through Frank Lampard's goal within six minutes of the restart and Wayne Bridge's winning goal in the 87th minute. The first leg of the semi-final however turned out to be a disaster for Chelsea as they were defeated 3–1 by ten-man Monaco at Stade Louis II stadium. Two weeks later at Stamford Bridge, they were leading 2–0 shortly before the halftime. Had they kept this score to the final whistle, they would go through on away goals. However, Monaco eventually came back in the second half and the game ended in a 2-2 draw. As a consequence, Claudio Ranieri was sacked at the end of the season.

Chelsea came very close to winning the Champions League several times during the 2000s. The closest they came was in the 2008 final, held at the Luzhniki Stadium in Moscow. This was the first ever all-English Champions League/European Cup final, with Chelsea facing Manchester United. The game was tightly contested, with the final score after extra time 1–1. In the penalty shoot-out, Chelsea were one kick away from winning the Champions League (Petr Čech having saved Cristiano Ronaldo's penalty). However, Chelsea's captain John Terry slipped on his run up for the final penalty and his shot hit the post. Edwin van der Sar then saved Nicolas Anelka's spot kick and Manchester United were crowned European Champions for the third time in their history.

The following season, Chelsea were on course to make their second final in two years. Following a 0–0 draw at the Camp Nou, Chelsea were beating Barcelona 1–0 at the Stamford Bridge, but Barcelona managed to score an equaliser in the 94th minute of the game. With the score at 1–1, Barcelona progressed to the 2009 Champions League Final on away goals. Numerous Chelsea players protested after the final whistle, most notable José Bosingwa and Didier Drogba. Drogba shouted into television cameras that the game was "a fucking disgrace." Both players were handed bans by UEFA for their actions.

Chelsea would not feature in a Champions League final again until the 2012 final that was being held at the Munich's Allianz Arena. After eliminating Napoli, Benfica and Barcelona, Chelsea faced German side Bayern Munich, who would be playing the final at their home ground. Bayern controlled the game for the most part, and took the lead in the 83rd minute through Thomas Müller. Didier Drogba equalised five minutes later with a header from a corner from Juan Mata. In extra time, Bayern missed several opportunities (including a penalty from former Chelsea player Arjen Robben) and the game was to be decided with a penalty shoot-out. Chelsea eventually triumphed 4–3, despite Juan Mata missing their first penalty. Two Bayern Munich players, Ivica Olić and Bastian Schweinsteiger, failed to convert their penalties. Drogba scored the final penalty of the shootout to secure the Blues' first ever Champions League title. As title holders, Chelsea secured a place in next season's Champions League after missing out of qualification, as a result of finishing sixth in Premier League.

Nine years after their Champions League triumph, Chelsea were able to secure a place in the 2021 final, which was held at Estádio do Dragão in Porto against fellow English side Manchester City. This was the third time that two English sides would face in the final (after 2008 – which Chelsea also involved – and 2019). Despite the odds being in Manchester City's favour and City dominating the possession throughout the game, Chelsea prevailed and were crowned Champions of Europe for the second time in the club's history after Kai Havertz scored the only goal of the match in the 42nd minute, after Mason Mount's pass to him through on goal leading to Havertz taking the ball round Manchester City's goalkeeper Ederson, and passing it into the net.

Records
First international match: Copenhagen XI v. Chelsea, 1958–60 Inter-Cities Fairs Cup, 30 September 1958
Biggest win in international competitions: 13–0, Chelsea v. Jeunesse Hautcharage, 1971–72 UEFA Cup Winners' Cup, 29 September 1971
Biggest defeat in international competitions: 5–1, Barcelona v. Chelsea, 1999–2000 UEFA Champions League, 18 April 2000
Most appearances in international competitions: John Terry, 124
Most goals in international competitions: Didier Drogba, 36

Matches
All results (home, away and neutral) list Chelsea's goal tally first.

Colour key

Key
a.e.t. = After extra time
N = Neutral venue
a = Away goals rule
p = Penalty shoot-out

Overall record
All statistics are correct as of 7 March 2023. Including matches in UEFA Champions League, UEFA Cup / UEFA Europa League, European Cup Winners' Cup / UEFA Cup Winners' Cup, UEFA Super Cup, Inter-Cities Fairs Cup, FIFA Club World Cup, and each competition's associated qualifying rounds.

Colour key

By competition

By country

By team

All-time top goal scorers
All statistics are correct as of 7 March 2023. Including matches in UEFA Champions League, UEFA Cup / UEFA Europa League, European Cup Winners' Cup / UEFA Cup Winners' Cup, UEFA Super Cup, Inter-Cities Fairs Cup, FIFA Club World Cup, and each competition's associated qualifying rounds.

Key

UCL = UEFA Champions League
UEL = UEFA Cup / UEFA Europa League
CWC = European Cup Winners' Cup / UEFA Cup Winners' Cup
USC = UEFA Super Cup
FC = Inter-Cities Fairs Cup
FCWC = FIFA Club World Cup

Notes

References

International
Chelsea